Bonacossa Borri, also known as Bonaca, or Bonaccossi Bonacosta (1254–1321), was Lady of Milan by marriage from 1269 to 1321.

Biography

Bonacossa was the daughter of Squarcina Borri (1230–1277, also called Scarsini), captain of exiles from Milan from the advent of the Torriani family, and a loyal supporter of the Visconti, and Antonia (1236–?), of unknown lineage, who married in 1254. Borri's family was originally from the town of Santo Stefano Ticino together with some feudal lands of nearby Corby. The Borri family was one of the most respected of Milan, and counted among its ranks a saint, Monas of Milan, Bishop of Milan.

Once the Visconti had conquered Milan, Squarcina Borri gave his daughter in marriage to Matteo I Visconti, Lord of Milan in 1269 to cement those bonds essential to maintaining the rule of the Visconti.

Bonacossa and her husband co-founded of the chapel of St. Thomas in the Basilica of Sant'Eustorgio of Milan, where they were buried, along with their son Stefano and his two daughters Beatrice and Catherine, and the brother of Matteo, Uberto III Visconti.

She died in Milan on 13 January 1321 .

Descendants
 Galeazzo I Lord of Milan. He married Beatrice d'Este
 Beatrice (b. 1280), married Spinetta Malaspina of Verucola
 Caterina (b. 1282 – d. 1311), married Alboino della Scala
 Luchino (b. 1285) Lord of Milan, married Violente di Saluzzo
 Stefano (b. 1287) Count of Arona, married Valentina Doria
 Marco (b. 1289)
 Giovanni (b. 1291), Archbishop of Milan
 Zaccaria (b. 1295), married Otto Rusconi
 Floramonda, married Guido Mandelli, count of Maccagno
 Agnese, married Cecchino della Scala

See also
 Corbetta, Lombardy
 Santo Stefano Ticino

External links
 

1254 births
1321 deaths
House of Visconti
Nobility from Milan
13th-century Italian women
14th-century Italian women